Drew Hutchison (born 26 April 1995) is an Australian professional rugby league footballer who plays as a  and  for the Sydney Roosters in the NRL.

He previously played for the St. George Illawarra Dragons in the National Rugby League and the Leigh Centurions in the Betfred Championship.

Background
Hutchison was born in Wollongong, New South Wales, Australia.

He played his junior rugby league for the Albion Park-Oak Flats Eagles, before being signed by the St. George Illawarra Dragons.

Playing career

Early career
In 2013 and 2014, Drew Hutchison played for the St. George Illawarra Dragons' NYC team. On 3 May 2014, he was a late inclusion for the New South Wales under-20s team against the Queensland under-20s team, after Luke Brooks was withdrawn. On 2 September 2014, he was named at halfback in the 2014 NYC Team of the Year and re-signed with the Dragons on a 3-year contract until the end of 2017. On 18 October 2014, he played for the Junior Kangaroos against the Junior Kiwis.

2015
In 2015, Hutchison graduated to the Dragons' New South Wales Cup team, Illawarra Cutters. On 2 May 2015, he played for the Junior Kangaroos against Junior Kiwis for the second year in a row. On 8 July 2015, he captained the New South Wales under-20s team. In Round 18 of the 2015 NRL season, he made his NRL debut for the Dragons against the Cronulla-Sutherland Sharks.

2016
Hutchison kicked the winning field goal for the Illawarra Cutters in the 2016 Intrust Super Premiership NSW grand final win over the Mount Pritchard Mounties, winning 21–20.

2017
Hutchison was ruled out of the entire 2017 season when he suffered a serious injury at training. In October, he signed a 2-year contract with the Leigh Centurions in the Betfred Championship, starting in 2018.

2019
In 2019, Hutchison signed with the Sydney Roosters but spent the beginning of the season with the club's feeder side North Sydney.  In Round 13, Hutchison was called into the side to replace Luke Keary who was out injured.  Hutchison's first game with the club ended in a 19–10 loss against the Penrith Panthers.  The following week, Hutchison kept his place in the team and scored his first try for the club as they defeated Canterbury-Bankstown 38–12 at the Sydney Cricket Ground.

Hutchison featured for North Sydney in the 2019 Canterbury Cup NSW finals series against Newtown as Norths lost the match 30–28 at Leichhardt Oval.  Hutchison had a horror game with goal kicking as he only managed two out of a possible six conversions including missing a conversion from right in front of the posts.

2020
In round 15 of the 2020 NRL season, Hutchison scored his first try of the year as the Sydney Roosters defeated Wests Tigers 38–16 at Leichhardt Oval.

2021
In round 9 of the 2021 NRL season, he was taken to hospital after the conclusion of the first half against Parramatta with a broken rib and a suspected punctured lung.  The injury was sustained after Parramatta player Dylan Brown dived over the top of Hutchison as he attempted to score a try in the club's 31–18 loss.
He returned to first grade in round 16 
Jersey 20 via the bench.
Hutchison played a total of 20 games for the Sydney Roosters in the 2021 NRL season including the club's two finals matches.  The Sydney Roosters would be eliminated from the second week of the finals losing to Manly 42–6.

2022
Hutchison played 25 games for the Sydney Roosters in the 2022 NRL season including the clubs elimination final loss to South Sydney. Throughout the season he featured as a Hooker, Five-Eighth and Centre.

References

External links

Sydney Roosters profile
Leigh Centurions profile
St. George Illawarra Dragons profile

1995 births
Living people
Australian rugby league players
Illawarra Cutters players
Junior Kangaroos players
Leigh Leopards players
North Sydney Bears NSW Cup players
Rugby league five-eighths
Rugby league halfbacks
Rugby league players from Wollongong
St. George Illawarra Dragons players
Sydney Roosters players